The 2019 Liuzhou Open was a professional tennis tournament played on hard courts. It was the second edition of the tournament for men and fourth edition for women. It was the part of the 2019 ATP Challenger Tour and 2019 ITF Women's World Tennis Tour. It took place in Liuzhou, China between 21 October and 3 November 2019.

Men's singles main draw entrants

Seeds

 1 Rankings are as of October 14, 2019.

Other entrants
The following players received wildcards into the singles main draw:
  Li Yuanfeng
  Mo Yecong
  Wang Aoran
  Wu Hao
  Xia Zihao

The following player received entry into the singles main draw using a protected ranking:
  Nicolás Barrientos

The following players received entry from the qualifying draw:
  Toshihide Matsui
  Matej Sabanov

The following player received entry as a lucky loser:
  Ivan Sabanov

Women's singles main draw entrants

Seeds

 1 Rankings are as of October 21, 2019.

Other entrants
The following players received wildcards into the singles main draw:
  Liu Yanni
  Ma Yexin
  Sun Xuliu
  Yuan Chengyiyi

The following player received special exempts into the singles main draw:
  Anastasia Gasanova
  Kathinka von Deichmann

The following players received entry from the qualifying draw:
  Guo Hanyu
  Guo Meiqi
  Liu Fangzhou
  Akiko Omae
  Urszula Radwańska
  Raluca Șerban
  Daria Snigur
  Sun Ziyue

The following players received entry as lucky losers:
  Kim Da-bin
  Dejana Radanović

Champions

Men's singles

  Alejandro Davidovich Fokina def.  Denis Istomin 6–3, 5–7, 7–6(7–5).

Women's singles

  Zhu Lin def.  Arina Rodionova, 2–6, 6–0, 6–1

Men's doubles

  Mikhail Elgin /  Denis Istomin def.  Nam Ji-sung /  Song Min-kyu 3–6, 6–4, [10–6].

Women's doubles

  Jiang Xinyu /  Tang Qianhui def.  Ankita Raina /  Rosalie van der Hoek, 6–4, 6–4

References

Liuzhou Open
Liuzhou Open
2019 in Chinese tennis
Liuzhou Open
October 2019 sports events in China
November 2019 sports events in China